Tengku Dato' Setia Putra Al-Haj bin Tengku Azman Shah Al-Haj (born 22 July 1951) is a Malaysian corporate figure and a member of the Selangor Royal Family and Kelantan Royal Family. He is the first son of Tengku Bendahara Tengku Azman Shah ibni Al-Marhum Sultan Hisamuddin Alam Shah and the cousin of the current Sultan, Sultan Sharafuddin Idris Shah. He is currently holding the position as Selangor Palace Major Chief (Orang Besar Istana) and been re-appointed as a royal council members on 11 December 2016 as one of the members in advisory body to the Sultan of Selangor.

Biography
 
Tengku Dato' Setia Putra Alhaj  was born on 22 July 1951 in Kota Bahru, Kelantan the state capital of Kelantan at that time. He is the first child of the Tengku Bendahara Tengku Azman Shah ibni Al-Marhum Sultan Hisamuddin Alam Shah, (Been appointed Regent of Selangor since 13 May 1959) and Tengku Thuraya Puteri binti Al-Marhum Sultan Ibrahim (Tengku Puan Bendahara of Selangor), a Princess of Kelantan. His uncle became the Sultan of Selangor on 1 September 1960, after the death of his grandfather Almarhum Sultan Hisamudin Alam Shah Alhaj.
Tengku Dato' Setia Putra Alhaj was a Navy Aide-de-Camp (A.D.C.) and personal assistant to his uncle Sultan Salahuddin Abdul Aziz Shah Alhaj and 2nd Yang di-Pertuan Agong of Malaysia before joining cooperate business.

Tengku Dato' Setia Putra Alhaj has extensive interest in Civil and Building Construction, Property Development, Design and Manufacturing Specialist Vehicles such as Fire Engine and Ambulance. Under his leadership, he and his partner companies had successfully completed several Privatize and Joint Venture development projects with the State governments of Selangor and Johor. One of the well known achievement is the development of a premier resort cum resident and USGA class championship Golf Course Kelab Golf Sultan Abdul Aziz Shah in Shah Alam, Malaysia. He is co-chairman of Power Root Berhad and Independent Non-Executive Director of CME Berhad which both listed in Bursa Malaysia. Furthermore, he had been appointed as the chairman for Selangor Royal Galley, Sultan Abdul Aziz Royal Gallery to preserve the royal culture for his ancestors.

Taman Tengku Bendahara Azman, located in Klang, Selangor and Two school, SK Tengku Bendahara Azman (1) and SK Tengku Bendahara Azman (2) that named after his late father Tengku Bendahara Tengku Azman Shah had now been chaired by him
after his father died on 23 March 2014

Titles and honours

12 December 2015 – Present: 
English: (His Highness) Tengku Dato' Setia Putra Alhaj bin Tengku Azman Shah Alhaj, The Tengku Indera Pahlawan Diraja of Selangor
Malay: (Yang Amat Dihormati) Tengku Dato' Setia Putra Alhaj bin Tengku Azman Shah Alhaj, Tengku Indera Pahlawan Diraja Selangor

On 7 September 1985, the late Sultan of Selangor, Sultan Salahuddin Abdul Aziz Shah Alhaj had awarded Tengku Putra Alhaj The Order of Sultan Salahuddin Abdul Aziz Shah Setia Sultan Salahuddin Abdul Aziz Shah (S.S.A.) with carried the title "SETIA"  for his loyalty to the state. On 3 April 1993, the late Sultan of Selangor, Sultan Salahuddin Abdul Aziz Shah Alhaj had awarded Tengku Putra Alhaj  The Order of Sultan Salahuddin Abdul Aziz Shah Dato' Sultan Salahuddin Abdul Aziz Shah(D.S.S.A) with carried the title "DATO". On 1 December 2004, the current Sultan of Selangor, Sultan Sharafuddin Idris Shah Alhaj had conferred upon Tengku Dato' Setia Putra Alhaj the title "Orang Besar Istana" (Palace Major Chief) with carried the title "Tengku Indera Pahlawan Diraja" for the state of Selangor. On the 1st of 2007, the current Sultan of Selangor, Sultan Sharafuddin Idris Shah had promote and appointed Tengku Dato' Setia Putra Alhaj to be a member to the "" (A Council of the Royal Court). On 30 March 2009, the late Sultan of Kelantan, Sultan Ismail Petra had awarded Tengku Putra Alhaj  Order of the Life of the Crown of Kelantan Dato’ Paduka Jiwa Mahkota Kelantan with carried the title "DATO". On 12 December 2015, the current Sultan of Selangor, Sultan Sharafuddin Idris Shah had awarded Tengku Putra Alhaj  Order of Sultan Sharafuddin Idris Shah Dato’ Sri Setia Sultan Sharafuddin Idris Shah with carried the title "DATO SETIA"

  

Honours that he has been awarded :

Honours of Malaysia

  Companion  of the Order of Sultan Salahuddin Abdul Aziz Shah (SSA, 7 September 1985)
  Knight Companion of the Order of Sultan Salahuddin Abdul Aziz Shah (DSSA, 3 April 1993)
  Knight Grand Companion of the Order of Sultan Sharafuddin Idris Shah (SSIS, 12 December 2015)
  Tengku Indera Pahlawan Diraja Selangor - Selangor Council of the Royal Court (Dewan Diraja Selangor) (1 December 2007)
 Selangor Palace Major Chief  with the title "Tengku Indera Pahlawan Diraja"(1 December 2004)
 : 
  Knight Commander of the Order of the Life of the Crown of Kelantan or Star of Ismail (DJMK, 30 March 2009)

References

1951 births
People from Kelantan
Living people
Royal House of Selangor
Malaysian socialites
Malaysian businesspeople
Malaysian people of Malay descent
Malaysian Muslims